Hisonotus is a genus of armored catfishes native to South America. Species of Hisonotus and Curculionichthys are the only representatives of the subfamily Otothyrinae having serrae on the posterior edge of the pectoral fin spine. These species are small fishes, generally found in small fast flowing streams, where they grasp to the branches and leaves of aquatic or subaquatic plants. The species of this genus mostly occur in Atlantic coastal streams of southern Brazil and the Paraguay-Paraná system of
southern South America. They are also distributed in the Río de La Plata basin and coastal rivers of southeastern Brazil.

Taxonomy
Hisonotus and Microlepidogaster have, until recently, been considered as synonymous, although they are now recognized as separate and valid taxa. In the most recent phylogenetic hypotheses, both Hisonotus and Parotocinclus are relatively basal taxa within the Otothyrini clade.

Species
There are currently 34 recognized species in this genus:
 Hisonotus acuen G. S. C. Silva, Roxo & C. de Oliveira, 2014 
 Hisonotus aky (Azpelicueta, Casciotta, Almirón & Koerber, 2004)
 Hisonotus alberti Roxo, G. S. C. Silva, Waltz & J. E. García-Melo, 2016 
 Hisonotus armatus T. P. Carvalho, Lehmann A., E. H. L. Pereira & R. E. dos Reis, 2008 
 Hisonotus bocaiuva Roxo, G. S. C. Silva, C. de Oliveira & Zawadzki, 2013 
 Hisonotus bockmanni M. de Carvalho & Datovo, 2012 
 Hisonotus brunneus T. P. Carvalho & R. E. dos Reis, 2011
 Hisonotus carreiro T. P. Carvalho & R. E. dos Reis, 2011
 Hisonotus charrua Almirón, Azpelicueta, Casciotta & Litz, 2006
 Hisonotus chromodontus Britski & Garavello, 2007 
 Hisonotus depressicauda (A. Miranda-Ribeiro, 1918)
 Hisonotus depressinotus (A. Miranda-Ribeiro, 1918)
 Hisonotus devidei (Roxo, Silva & Melo, 2018)
 Hisonotus francirochai (Ihering (pt), 1928)
 Hisonotus heterogaster T. P. Carvalho & R. E. dos Reis, 2011
 Hisonotus hungy Azpelicueta, Almirón, Casciotta & Koerber, 2007 
 Hisonotus iota T. P. Carvalho & R. E. dos Reis, 2009
 Hisonotus laevior Cope, 1894
 Hisonotus leucofrenatus (A. Miranda-Ribeiro, 1908)
 Hisonotus leucophrys T. P. Carvalho & R. E. dos Reis, 2009
 Hisonotus maculipinnis (Regan, 1912)
 Hisonotus megaloplax T. P. Carvalho & R. E. dos Reis, 2009
 Hisonotus montanus T. P. Carvalho & R. E. dos Reis, 2009
 Hisonotus nigricauda (Boulenger, 1891)
 Hisonotus notatus C. H. Eigenmann & R. S. Eigenmann, 1889 
 Hisonotus notopagos T. P. Carvalho & R. E. dos Reis, 2011
 Hisonotus pachysarkos Zawadzki, Roxo & da Graça, 2016 
 Hisonotus paulinus (Regan, 1908)
 Hisonotus prata T .P. Carvalho & R. E. dos Reis, 2011
 Hisonotus ringueleti Aquino, Schaefer & Miquelarena, 2001
 Hisonotus taimensis (Buckup, 1981)
 Hisonotus thayeri Martins & Langeani, 2016 
 Hisonotus vespuccii Roxo, G. S. C. Silva & C. de Oliveira, 2015 
 Hisonotus vireo T. P. Carvalho & R. E. dos Reis, 2011

References

Otothyrinae
Fish of South America
Catfish genera
Taxa named by Rosa Smith Eigenmann
Taxa named by Carl H. Eigenmann
Freshwater fish genera